Druento is a comune (municipality) in the Metropolitan City of Turin in the Italian region Piedmont, located about  northwest of Turin.

Druento is located in a hilly-plain territory, between the Givoletto mountains and the Turin plain. Attractions include La Mandria Regional Park, housing a former house of Savoy Royal residence.

Druento is an industrial town. Here, during the 20th century, numerous immigrants from southern Italy moved to work at FIAT or connected companies.

References

Cities and towns in Piedmont